Tonantzin Carmelo is an American actress. She is known for her acting roles in film, TV and stage productions including in the Steven Spielberg miniseries, Into the West, for which she received a Screen Actors Guild nomination for Outstanding Performance by a Female in a Television Movie or Miniseries.

In 2021, Carmelo filmed roles in Spain and Australia for the television series The English (BBC) and La Brea (NBC).

Early life and education
Carmelo grew up in Orange County, southern California and is of Indigenous and Latina descent. As a youth, she participated in Native dances and music, touring with cultural groups throughout North America. She also became a technically trained dancer and performed with the modern dance company Daystar.

Carmelo attended the University of California, Irvine, where she earned a bachelor's degree in Environmental Studies and a minor in Dance. While in college, she began acting in theater productions and independent films.

Career
Carmelo began her professional acting career in an educational musical theater show produced by Carmen Zapata at the Bilingual Foundation of the Arts. The production toured the Los Angeles area.

In 2007, Carmelo played the leading role of Shayla Stonefeather in the thriller Imprint.

In addition, Carmelo is a choreographer. Her work was featured in the Amazon TV series, Undone, and in the opera, Sweetland. She has also performed as a singer with the band Trio del Alma and has recorded on three albums for Canyon Records.

In 2012, Carmelo testified for the United States Senate Committee on Indian Affairs on the images of Native Americans in Hollywood.

Carmelo has also appeared in several video games, including Dead Space, The Crew, Lego Marvel's Avengers, and Cyberpunk 2077. Her memorable motion-capture and voice performance portrayal of the villainous character Kendra Daniels for Dead Space led Maxim Magazine to add Kendra to their Hottest Video Game Babes of the Year list. Today, the character continues to attract legions of loyal fans.

She has had an ongoing relationship with Native Voices at the Autry Museum in Los Angeles, where she has performed on stage and has served on the advisory board.

She is a member of the Tongva Language Committee for Revitalization.

Awards and nominations
On January 5, 2006, Carmelo was nominated for the Screen Actors Guild Award for Outstanding Performance by a Female Actor in a Television Movie or Miniseries for her performance as Thunder Heart Woman in Into the West.

Carmelo also won the American Indian Film Festival award for Best Actress and was nominated for the Best Actress award at the Hoboken International Film Festival for this role. She was also named "An Indie Darling to Crave" at the Sundance Film Festival 2015 for her role as Teresa, opposite John C. Reilly in the film Entertainment. Below is a list of her awards and nominations.

Filmography

Video games

References

External links
Tonantzin Carmelo's official website 

Canyon Records Productions
California Indian Storytellers Association
Native Voices at the Autry

Year of birth missing (living people)
Living people
Native American actresses
Actresses from Orange County, California
Tongva
University of California, Irvine alumni
21st-century American women